The year 2008 is the 16th year in the history of the Ultimate Fighting Championship (UFC), a mixed martial arts promotion based in the United States. In 2008 the UFC held 20 events beginning with, UFC 80: Rapid Fire.

Title fights

The Ultimate Fighter

Debut UFC fighters

The following fighters fought their first UFC fight in 2008:

Amir Sadollah
Andre Gusmao
Antonio Mendes
Brad Blackburn
Brad Morris
Brandon Wolff
Brock Lesnar
Brodie Farber
C.B. Dollaway
Cain Velasquez
CB Dollaway
Chris Wilson
Corey Hill
Dale Hartt
Dan Evensen
Dan Hardy
Dan Miller
Dante Rivera
Dave Kaplan
David Baron
David Bielkheden
Dong Hyun Kim
Efrain Escudero
Eliot Marshall
George Roop
Goran Reljic
James Giboo

James Lee
Jason Brilz
Jason Day
Jesse Taylor
Jim Miller
Joe Vedepo
Johnny Rees
Jon Jones
Josh Hendricks
Jules Bruchez
Junior dos Santos
Justin Buchholz
Kevin Burns
Krzysztof Soszynski
Kyle Kingsbury
Matt Brown
Matt Horwich
Matthew Riddle
Mike Massenzio
Michael Patt
Mike Wessel
Mostapha Al Turk
Nate Loughran
Neil Wain
Pat Barry

Paul Kelly
Per Eklund
Phillipe Nover
Rafael dos Anjos
Reese Andy
Rob Kimmons
Rob Yundt
Rolando Delgado
Rory Markham
Rousimar Palhares
Ryan Bader
Ryan Roberts
Ryan Thomas
Samy Schiavo
Shane Carwin
Shane Nelson
Shane Primm
Shannon Gugerty
Steve Bruno
Steve Cantwell
Tim Boetsch
Tim Credeur
Tom Lawlor
Vinny Magalhães
Yoshiyuki Yoshida

Events list

See also
 UFC
 List of UFC champions
 List of UFC events

References

Ultimate Fighting Championship by year
2008 in mixed martial arts